Loud Jazz is a studio album by jazz guitarist John Scofield. It is the second recording to feature bass guitarist Gary Grainger and drummer Dennis Chambers. Also appearing are keyboardist George Duke and percussionist Don Alias.

Reception 
AllMusic awarded the album with 4 stars and its review by Scott Yanow states: "The music (which includes such numbers as "Tell You What", "Dirty Rice", "Wabash" and "Spy Vs. Spy") has few memorable melodies but plenty of dynamic playing by Scofield, who at this point was growing as a major stylist from album to album".

Track listing

Personnel
 John Scofield – electric guitar
 Robert Aries – keyboards
 George Duke – keyboards
 Gary Grainger – bass guitar
 Dennis Chambers – drums
 Don Alias – percussion

References 

1988 albums
John Scofield albums
Gramavision Records albums